The 2009 Royal Rumble was the 22nd annual Royal Rumble professional wrestling pay-per-view (PPV) event produced by World Wrestling Entertainment (WWE). It was held for wrestlers from the promotion's Raw, SmackDown, and ECW brand divisions. The event took place on January 25, 2009, at the Joe Louis Arena in Detroit, Michigan. As has been customary since 1993, the Royal Rumble match winner received a world championship match at that year's WrestleMania. For the 2009 event, the winner received their choice to challenge for either Raw's World Heavyweight Championship, SmackDown's WWE Championship, or the ECW Championship at WrestleMania 25.

Five professional wrestling matches were featured on the event's supercard, a scheduling of more than one main event. The main event was the 2009 Royal Rumble match, which featured wrestlers from all three brands. Raw's Randy Orton, the eighth entrant, won the match by last eliminating SmackDown's Triple H, the seventh entrant. The primary match on the Raw brand was John Cena versus John "Bradshaw" Layfield (JBL) for the World Heavyweight Championship, which Cena won to retain the title. The primary match on the SmackDown brand was a No Disqualification match between Jeff Hardy and Edge for the WWE Championship, which Edge won to win his fourth and last WWE Championship. The predominant match on the ECW brand was between Jack Swagger and Matt Hardy for the ECW Championship, which Swagger won to retain. This event also marked the first appearance of Rob Van Dam in WWE since One Night Stand in June 2007.

Production

Background
The Royal Rumble is an annual gimmick pay-per-view (PPV), produced every January by World Wrestling Entertainment (WWE) since 1988. It is one of the promotion's original four pay-per-views, along with WrestleMania, SummerSlam, and Survivor Series, dubbed the "Big Four". It is named after the Royal Rumble match, a modified battle royal in which the participants enter at timed intervals instead of all beginning in the ring at the same time. The 2009 event was the 22nd event in the Royal Rumble chronology and was scheduled to be held on January 25, 2009, at the Joe Louis Arena in Detroit, Michigan. It featured wrestlers from the Raw, SmackDown, and ECW brands.

The Royal Rumble match generally features 30 wrestlers. Traditionally, the winner of the match earns a world championship match at that year's WrestleMania. For 2009, the winner could choose to challenge for either Raw's World Heavyweight Championship, SmackDown's WWE Championship, or the ECW Championship at WrestleMania 25.

Storylines 
The card consisted of six matches, as well as one dark match. The matches resulted from scripted storylines, where wrestlers portrayed heroes, villains, or less distinguishable characters to build tension and culminated in a wrestling match or series of matches. Results were predetermined by WWE's writers on the Raw, SmackDown, and ECW brands, with storylines produced on their weekly television shows, Raw, SmackDown, and ECW on Sci Fi.

The main rivalry from the Raw brand played out between John Cena and John "Bradshaw" Layfield (JBL) over the World Heavyweight Championship. JBL earned his championship match against Cena after winning a Fatal Four-Way Elimination match—a standard match in which the last remaining competitor who has not been eliminated is declared the winner—on the December 29, 2008, episode of Raw by defeating Chris Jericho, Randy Orton, and Shawn Michaels.

Another rivalry from the Raw brand came with Melina challenging Beth Phoenix for her WWE Women's Championship in a singles match. Melina won the opportunity to face Phoenix on the December 29, 2008. episode of Raw by winning a battle royal, a match similar to the Royal Rumble, though with fewer competitors.

The main rivalry from the SmackDown brand incorporated into the Royal Rumble featured Jeff Hardy and Edge, with the two feuding over the WWE Championship. At WWE's previous pay-per-view event, Armageddon, Hardy had defeated both defending champion Edge and Triple H in a Triple Threat match, a standard match involving three wrestlers, to win the WWE Championship. On the January 2, 2009, episode of SmackDown, on-air authority figure Vickie Guerrero announced that Edge would face Hardy for the WWE title at the Royal Rumble.

The ECW brand's main rivalry, that between Jack Swagger and Matt Hardy, had the two feuding over the ECW Championship. On the January 13, 2009, episode of ECW on Syfy, Swagger defeated Hardy to capture the ECW Championship. On the January 16 episode of Friday Night SmackDown, WWE announced that Swagger would defend the ECW title against Hardy in a rematch at the Royal Rumble.

Event

Preliminary matches
The first match of the evening saw Jack Swagger defend the ECW Championship against Matt Hardy. The match started with both wrestlers countering each other's moves until Swagger injured Hardy's left shoulder and then targeted it for the rest of the match. Swagger ultimately defeated Hardy by pinning him after slamming him to the mat with a gutwrench powerbomb. Swagger thus retained the ECW title.

The second match involved the WWE Women's Championship, where Beth Phoenix defended her title against Melina. The match ended when Phoenix attempted the Glam Slam on Melina, but Melina countered into a roll-up pin, to win the Women's Championship.

Main event matches

The third match on the card pitted John Cena against John "Bradshaw" Layfield (JBL) for the World Heavyweight Championship. JBL's employee Shawn Michaels accompanied him to the ring and first got involved in the match when the referee became incapacitated; he came into the ring and performed his Sweet Chin Music finisher both on JBL and Cena. He then left ringside, leaving JBL's arm on top of Cena. Cena however managed to get a shoulder up and performed an Attitude Adjustment to retain his World Championship.

In the fourth match, Jeff Hardy defended the WWE Championship against Edge. Before the match began, Vickie Guerrero came out and announced the match to be No Disqualifications. Edge then revealed that Chavo Guerrero would be in his corner. During the match Hardy brought a ladder out and set it up near the Spanish announce table. When Chavo tried to interfere, Hardy put him on the table and jumped off the ladder, connecting with Chavo and breaking the table. Hardy then had the match won when he performed the Swanton on Edge after kicking Vickie off the apron when she tried to interfere. When Hardy went for the pin, Vickie stopped referee Scott Armstrong from making a three count. Jeff's brother Matt then made his way to the ring, placing a chair under Edge's face. Grabbing another chair, Matt at first appeared to be setting Edge up for his own version of Edge's con-chair-to maneuver. He instead hit Jeff in the head with the chair, allowing Edge to then pin Jeff and become the new WWE Champion.

Jim Ross and Jerry Lawler came out to call the main event. The main event consisted of the Royal Rumble match. Rey Mysterio and John Morrison started the Rumble. As Finlay entered at No. 14, Rey Mysterio stepped on the just eliminated John Morrison and The Miz to avoid elimination. Santino Marella entered at No. 28 and was eliminated by Kane in one second. Breaking the Warlord's record for shortest elimination in the Royal Rumble. The final six participants left in the match were The Big Show, The Undertaker, Triple H and The Legacy (Cody Rhodes, Ted DiBiase and Randy Orton). While the Undertaker and Big Show brawled on the outside apron (both went over the top rope, but had not hit the floor), Orton eliminated Big Show with an RKO, causing him to fall off the apron. Big Show eliminated The Undertaker shortly thereafter when he pulled his opponent off the apron by his leg. Despite being at a disadvantage against the Legacy, Triple H eliminated both DiBiase and Rhodes. With Triple H by the ropes, Orton quickly clotheslined him from behind to send him over the top rope and become the winner of the Royal Rumble match.

Aftermath

On the January 26 episode of Raw, The Legacy came out with two lawyers and a therapist. Randy Orton then revealed that he suffers from IED, which causes him to experience violent outbursts when provoked, losing all control of his emotions and actions. According to Orton and his lawyers, Orton had told Stephanie McMahon that if fired, he would not only take DiBiase and Rhodes with him but the whole locker room, as he would bring in a lawsuit against the company.

The Raw brand started the qualifying matches for the brand's upcoming Elimination Chamber match at WWE's next pay-per-view event, No Way Out. Three of the qualifying matches saw Kofi Kingston defeat Kane, Rey Mysterio defeat William Regal and Chris Jericho defeat CM Punk to qualify. In a fourth qualification match, Shawn Michaels failed to win a match against John Cena that would have made JBL eligible to participate in the Elimination Chamber.

The ECW Championship feud between Jack Swagger and Matt Hardy had officially finished when ECW's on-air authority figure Theodore Long announced on the January 27 episode of ECW that Hardy had requested a move to the SmackDown brand. Swagger had other problems as his ECW title belt was stolen by Hornswoggle. When Hornswoggle's storyline father, Finlay, urged Hornswoggle to give the title back to Swagger, Swagger shoved Hornswoggle to the ground, which caused Finlay to knock down Swagger with his own championship belt.

On the January 30 episode of SmackDown, Matt Hardy proclaimed that he had no remorse about smashing his brother Jeff in the head at the Royal Rumble and costing him the WWE Championship. He then told the universe that he no longer considered Jeff a partner or a sibling. There were three Elimination Chamber qualifiers for No Way Out. The first match being The Undertaker versus Mark Henry, which Undertaker won via submission with the Hell's Gate. The second qualifier match was The Big Show defeating Festus with a K.O. Punch. The last qualifier was a triple threat match featuring Triple H, The Great Khali and Vladimir Kozlov. Triple H won the match after he delivered a Pedigree to Khali to pick up the victory.

During the 2009 WWE Draft, the World Heavyweight Championship and WWE Championship switched brands.

Results

Royal Rumble entrances and eliminations

 – Raw
 – SmackDown!
 – ECW
 – Legend
 – Winner

 Big Show's elimination of Undertaker came after Big Show was eliminated by Randy Orton.

References

External links

Official website

2009
2009 in Detroit
Events in Detroit
Professional wrestling in Detroit
2009 WWE pay-per-view events
January 2009 events in the United States